Max Armstrong (born June 13, 1953, Owensville, Indiana) is an American agriculture broadcaster from Chicago, Illinois.

Broadcast History 
Armstrong's first job out of college was for the Illinois Farm Bureau as a Broadcast Editor, which was where he met Orion Samuelson. For 42 years, Max Armstrong and Orion Samuelson have partnered together, first on WGN radio, and later on the TV Show U.S. Farm Report, until creating the show This Week in Agribusiness.

Since July 2009, Armstrong has been director of broadcasting for Farm Progress. He produces and hosts the Farm Progress America and Max Armstrong’s Midwest Digest daily radio programs. Armstrong also hosts a three-minute feature, "Farming America", on the Tribune Radio Network. 

From 1977 to 2009, Armstrong was the agri-business broadcaster for WGN Radio before the program transitioned to a weekly Saturday morning show and accompanying podcast entitled The Morning Show with Orion and Max.

"This Week in AgriBusiness" 
Since August 2005, Armstrong has been co-host and co-founder of This Week in AgriBusiness, owned and produced with Samuelson. The show is a weekly agriculture television show, produced by OMAX Communications, LLC in cooperation with 22 Creative Group and Farm Progress. In addition to its syndication run, the show is broadcast on RFD-TV.

National Association of Farm Broadcasting ("NAFB") 
In 2001, Armstrong was named Farm Broadcaster of the Year by the NAFB. In 2017, Max Armstrong was elected President of the NAFB. Armstrong was a member of NAFB for 40 years before being elected president.

WGN Radio Walk of Fame 
In 2016, Armstrong earned a plaque on the WGN Radio Walk of Fame in Chicago. Armstrong was full-time with WGN Radio for 32 years until 2009. The bronze plaque is in the sidewalk outside the Tribune Tower studios at 435 North Michigan Avenue in Chicago. The induction ceremony took place on May 27, 2016, where Armstrong was honored along with 6 others.

Max's Tractor Shed 
On This Week in Agribusiness, Armstrong has a segment "Max's Tractor Shed," which features vintage tractors sent in by viewers. These stories were also translated into Max Armstrong's Tractor App, launched in 2013.

"Stories from the Heartland" 
In 2015, Armstrong published his first book, titled "Stories from the Heartland."

Philanthropy 
For 22 years, Armstrong contributed his time as an appointed Fire Commissioner in the Western Suburbs of Chicago. Serving on a three-member board, he hires and promotes full-time firefighters and paramedics for one of the highest-rated (ISO 1) fire service organizations in the United States, the Lisle-Woodridge Fire Protection District.

Awards and honors 

 At Purdue University, Armstrong received honors as an "Old Master" in 2005 and was recognized as a "Noted Alumnus" in the 2009 'Facts at Your Fingertips.' Armstrong also was awarded an Alum Certificate of Distinction from the College of Agriculture and a Sagamore of the Wabash, given by the Governor of Indiana.
 Max Armstrong was named an Honorary Master Farmer in 2018 by Prairie Farmer Magazine.  
 Max Armstrong's Tractor App received a Best of NAMA award, along with awards from the American Agricultural Editors' Association and American Web Design awards.

References

External links
WGN Radio: Morning Show with Orion & Max 
Chicago Radio Spotlight interview with Max Armstrong
This Week in AgriBusiness
Farm Progress America
Max Armstrong's Daily Updates
This Week in AgriBusiness, Facebook
"Stories from the Heartland"
Max Armstrong's Tractor App in the Daily Herald
Max Armstrong's Tractor Stuff, Facebook

People from Chicago
Living people
Purdue University alumni
Farmers from Illinois
American radio personalities
American agriculturalists
American television personalities
Male television personalities
1953 births